Vilhelm Botyov Kraus (22 April 1949 – 5 June 2020) was a Bulgarian politician who served as Minister of Transport in the Kostov Government between 1997 and 1999.

Life

Kraus was born in Sofia and completed his university studies in the Technical University in the capital, specializing in automobile transport exploitation.

In the 1990s, he served as vice-mayor of Sofia.

After retiring from his political career, he became a businessman.

References 

1949 births
2020 deaths
Politicians from Sofia
Government ministers of Bulgaria
Union of Democratic Forces (Bulgaria) politicians